Stockyard is a coastal locality in the Livingstone Shire, Queensland, Australia. The town of Stockyard Point is located within the locality.

Geography
Waterpark Creek forms the southern and south-western boundaries, while the Coral Sea forms the eastern. Sandy Creek, a tributary of Waterpark, rises in the west of the locality and forms part of the western boundary. Byfield National Park occupies most of the locality.

References 

Shire of Livingstone
Coastline of Queensland
Localities in Queensland